Lake Superior Zendo (LSV) is a Sōtō Zen Buddhist temple located in Marquette, Michigan.  The zendo was founded in 1990 by Tesshin Paul Lehmberg, who received Dharma transmission from Rev. Shoken Winecoff of Ryumonji Zen Monastery.  Lake Superior Zendo is informally affiliated with Northern Michigan University through the Presque Isle Zen Community and participates in local interfaith events.

See also
 Zazen

References

External links
 

Buddhist temples in Michigan
Buddhism in Michigan
Zen centers in the United States
Buildings and structures in Marquette, Michigan